The Three Linguistic Spaces  (Tres Espacios Lingüísticos in Spanish, Trois Espaces linguistiques in French, Três Espaços Linguísticos in Portuguese, acronym: TEL) is a structure for cooperation between the Francophone, or French-speaking world, the Hispanophone or Spanish-speaking world, and the Lusophone, or Portuguese-speaking world. It is led by the Organization of Ibero-American States (OEI), the Community of Portuguese Language Countries (CPLP) and the  International Organisation of La Francophonie (OIF).

References

Organisation internationale de la Francophonie
Romance languages
Community of Portuguese Language Countries